Provanna shinkaiae is a species of sea snail, a marine gastropod mollusk in the family Provannidae.

Distribution
This abyssal species occurs on the slope of the Japan Trench.

References

 Okutani T. & Fujikura K. 2002. Abyssal gastropods and bivalves collected by Shinkai 6500 on slope of the Japan Trench. Venus, 60(4): 211–224

shinkaiae
Gastropods described in 2002